The 1900 United States presidential election in Mississippi took place on November 6, 1900. All contemporary 45 states were part of the 1900 United States presidential election. Mississippi voters chose nine electors to the Electoral College, which selected the president and vice president.

Mississippi was won by the Democratic nominees, former U.S. Representative William Jennings Bryan of Nebraska and his running mate Adlai Stevenson I of Illinois.

Results

Results by county

Notes

References

Mississippi
1900
1900 Mississippi elections